William Ross Schoemaker (September 4, 1863 – September 19, 1937) was an American Baptist pastor.

Personal life
Schoemaker was born in Muscatine, Iowa on September 4, 1863 as the eldest of 11 children. He married Helen Taylor (died 1921) in 1902, and after her death he married Helen Browning (died 1925) in 1922. He retired to San Diego in 1933 because of poor health. Schoemaker died in San Diego on September 19, 1937. He is buried at Greenwood Cemetery in Muscatine.

Career
Schoemaker graduated from Iowa State College with a bachelor's degree in 1889. He was a mathematics instructor at Cornell University until the age of 31, and then took up study of theology. He was pastor of the First Baptist Church in Menominee, Michigan when he received his PhD with a dissertation on the use of "spirit" in the Old Testament. He was also pastor of First Baptist Church, Glenwood, Iowa.

Works
 Gospel According to the Hebrews Chicago 1902
 The use of ruah in the old testament and of pneuma in the new Testament 1904

References

American biblical scholars
1863 births
1937 deaths
People from Muscatine County, Iowa
People from Menominee, Michigan
People from Glenwood, Iowa